"My Shot" is the third song from Act 1 of the musical Hamilton, based on the life of Alexander Hamilton, which premiered on Broadway in 2015. Lin-Manuel Miranda wrote both the music and lyrics to the song.

Synopsis

In 1776, having just emigrated from the island of Nevis to New York City, 19-year-old Alexander Hamilton wows several other young revolutionaries with his verbal skills, speaking about his hopes for the future, his disillusionment with the British, and his desire to be remembered, even if it means dying.

The other revolutionaries, who also rap about their own hopes for and reservations about the future, are:
 Marquis de Lafayette, a Frenchman who does not want to live under a monarch's rule. He mentions his fighting abilities and the possibility of a revolution in France, after Alexander hints at the imminent American revolution.
 Hercules Mulligan, a tailor's apprentice who wants to socially advance by joining the revolution.
 John Laurens, an abolitionist who will not be satisfied until all men have equal rights. He dreams of riding into battle with America's first all-black regiment.
 Aaron Burr, who reminds all of the men to keep quiet because loyalists may be among them.
Despite Burr's warnings, the men continue rapping about the rebellion and encouraging other Americans to rise up with them against the British, while Burr remains silent. The tune is reprised during the songs "Right Hand Man", "Yorktown (The World Turned Upside Down)", and "Non-Stop", while the some of the themes and lyrics are revisited in "The World Was Wide Enough". The number contains interpolations of lyrics from the rap songs "Shook Ones (Part II)" by Mobb Deep and "Going Back to Cali" by The Notorious B.I.G. It also contains a lyric from "You've Got to Be Carefully Taught", from South Pacific by Rodgers and Hammerstein. These sources are credited in the credits of the 2020 filmed version of Hamilton.

Analysis
Vibe described the backing as "reminiscent of the '90s". The Los Angeles Times said the song had "Eminem combustion". Vulture said the song was reminiscent of Eminem's "Lose Yourself". TapInto notes that this song becomes ironic by the end of the musical because Hamilton does, indeed, throw away his shot in the fatal duel with Aaron Burr. Deadline notes that "I am not throwing away my shot" becomes Hamilton's mantra.

Critical reception
TapInto deemed it a "ferocious song". The Huffington Post suggested the song would make a good opening number to the musical.

Popular culture

The song was one of many performed at the White House in March 2016.

A parody of the song was performed by Miranda as his opening monologue on the October 8, 2016, episode of Saturday Night Live.

The song was parodied and performed by The Roots during The Tonight Show Starring Jimmy Fallon "Football Raps" segment on August 3, 2017.

On March 9, 2021, a group of doctors called "Vax'n 8" released a remix of the song and a video called "My Shot: A COVID Vaccine Adaptation" to inspire people to get vaccinated for COVID-19.

Certifications

Mixtape version

"My Shot (Rise Up Remix)" is a song recorded by The Roots featuring Busta Rhymes, Joell Ortiz, and Nate Ruess from The Hamilton Mixtape. The song peaked at number 16 on the R&B/Hip-Hop Digital Song Sales chart. It was featured in the credits of the filmed version of the musical on Disney+.

References

2015 songs
Songs from Hamilton (musical)
The Roots songs
Busta Rhymes songs
Songs about freedom